Neubukow (literally "New Bukov", where 'Bukov' is a Polabian adjective from "beech tree") is a town in the Rostock district, in Mecklenburg-Western Pomerania, Germany. It is situated 18 km southwest of Bad Doberan, and 21 km northeast of Wismar. The archeologist Heinrich Schliemann was born in Neubukow. The "Heinrich Schliemann-Gedenkstätte" is a small museum dedicated to his life and work.

Partnerships

  Reinfeld, Schleswig-Holstein
  Steinfurt, North Rhine-Westphalia

Natives 
 Rudolf Goldschmidt (1876-1950), German engineer and inventor
 Heinrich Schliemann (1822-1890), German archaeologist

References

Cities and towns in Mecklenburg
1430s establishments in the Holy Roman Empire
1435 establishments in Europe
Populated places established in the 1430s
Grand Duchy of Mecklenburg-Schwerin